Annalisa Insardà (born October 13, 1978 in Polistena), grown up in Laureana di Borrello (province of Reggio Calabria, southern Italy), is an Italian film, TV, theater and voice actress. She is also an acting teacher in Rome.

Theatre (in Italy) 

  1998  The Threepenny Opera
  1998  The Trojan Women
  2005  Seven Against Thebes
  2005  When Love Speaks
  2005  Medea
  2006  Don Giovanni (Mozart) di Franco Ricci
  2006  Viaggio vuol dire mare di autori contemporanei, regia di Manuel Giliberti 
  2006  Lasciami stare regia di Manuel Giliberti (2006)
  2007  Edipo e la sfinge, regia di Manuel Giliberti 
  2008  Didone, directed di Manuel Giliberti 
  2012  Gaber... scik come me! testi di Giorgio Gaber e Luporini (2012)
  2013  Reality Shock with Annalisa Insardà (2013)
  2016  Matrimoni ed altri effetti collaterali di Ivan Campillo, regia di Manuel Giliberti (2016)
  2017  Medea di Antonio Tarantino (2017)
  2019  Manipolazione indolore   Annalisa Insardà 
  2020  Novantanovesimo cancello  by Enza Tomaselli

Filmography

  2000  Ricominciare (Italian soap opera)
  2002  Vivere (Italian soap opera)
  2003  L'ospite segreto (movie)
  2004  Un battito di vita (Short subject)
  2005  Lettere dalla Sicilia (movie)
  2006  Carabinieri 6 (fiction)
  2007  Un caso di coscienza 3 (fiction)
  2007  É tempo di cambiare (movie)
  2009  Pochi giorni per capire (film), directed by Carlo Fusco;
  2009  "Grigioscuro" (corto), directed by Enzo Carone
  2011  "Invidia"  directed by Robert Gilbert
  2011  "Alberi al vento", directed by Luca Fortino  
  2011  "Tienimi stretto", directed by Luca Fortino  ...Lucia  altri interpreti Peppino Mazzotta, Salvatore Lazzaro
  2011  “Piacere io sono Piero”, directed by Enzo Carone ..Lucia Licata
  2018  “I nostri figli”, (fiction) directed by Andrea Porporati ..Lorenza Carbone
  2020  “Come una madre”, (fiction) ..Matilde
  2021  Doc ..Milena

References

 

1978 births
Living people
Italian actresses
Italian voice actresses